Helena Solberg (born June 17, 1938 in Rio de Janeiro) is a Brazilian-born documentarist who, since 1971, has made her career in the United States. She is recognized as the only woman to participate in "Cinema Novo" movement in Brazil. 

In 1983, Solberg received an Emmy Award for From the Ashes: Nicaragua Today, documentary on a new society that born of political turmoil in Central America and the role that the U.S. plays in determining its future.

Biography
Helena Solberg was born in Rio de Janeiro, daughter of Norwegian father and Brazilian mother, lived for a long time in New York City, has established itself as a producer and director of documentaries in Brazil and the United States. She began her career from contact with big names of the new movies, as Carlos Diegues and Arnaldo Jabor, a time when she lived with them during the studies at the Pontifícia Universidade Católica do Rio de Janeiro. Solberg began in adolescence working as a reporter at the Metropolitano newspaper and by mastering English and French interviewed important names like the writer Clarice Lispector and also the philosopher Simone de Beauvoir and Jean Paul Sartre.

Her debut as a filmmaker occurred in 1966 with the short film A Entrevista. In 1969 directed Meio-dia, a fiction about the revolt of students in the classroom, with the context the period of military dictatorship in Brazil, Caetano Veloso's music, É proibido proibir.

In the 70s, she took up residence in the United States for about 30 years, where she directed several productions, among them: From the Ashes: Nicaragua Today (1982), which won a News & Documentary Emmy Award. From the 80s, began to produce a series of documentaries for international TV channels such as HBO, PBS, Channel 4, Radio and Television of Portugal, National Geographic Channel, among others.

In 1995, she produced, wrote and directed her first feature film, Carmen Miranda: Bananas is My Business, a mixture of documentary and fictional recreation from the singer Carmen Miranda's life. With Bananas is my business she won the Best Films award of the audience, the   critic and the jury at the Festival de Brasilia. The film also was awarded with the Golden Hugo for Best documentary at the Chicago International Film Festival and was selected among the 10 best in its category by the critic Andrew Sarris.

Her latest work and first fiction feature film is Vida de Menina, based on the book by Alice Dayrell Caldeira Brant, awarded with six prizes at the Gramado Film Festival 2004: Best Film, Screenplay, Photography, Soundtrack, Art Direction and Best Film by the audience.

She has two German grandchildren and a daughter who lives in the United States with the two kids.

Themes 
Helena Solberg's works provide examples of feminism in film and struggles with identity. Two of her movies, Carmen Miranda and Vida de Menina show intersections between these two themes. In an interview with actress Kate Lyra, Solberg describes the character from Vida de Menina as “very transgressive, a girl always testing the limits, always passing judgement on everything and everyone around her and it is in a way, a microcosm of Brazil.” Solberg uses her movies as tools for learning, describing individual stories as examples of larger themes and issues people across Brazil can identify with.

Legacy 
Her third film The Double Day (1975) is often cited as the first feminist film covering Latin America. Her emphasis on diversity is also reflected in her production process, which relies on locally recruited film crews and a female-majority crew in the case of The Double Day. According to Solberg, this encourages her subjects to feel more comfortable during interviews.

Recent film analysis has criticized some of her earlier work, such as The Double Day for homogenizing Latin America. Many of her films are intended for U.S. audiences and are therefore narrated exclusively in English for U.S. audiences. As a result, few of her early films have been translated into Spanish because of budget constraints.

Selected filmography (director)

References

External links
 

1942 births
Brazilian film directors
Brazilian women film directors
Brazilian screenwriters
Living people
Brazilian people of Norwegian descent
Brazilian women screenwriters